The Peel Sessions is the second EP by American heavy metal band Prong. It was released in 1990.

Recorded in 1989 and released by Strange Fruit Records, the EP features four tracks from Primitive Origins and Force Fed, but produced with a "cleaner" sound.

Track listing
"Defiant"
"Decay"
"Senseless Abuse"
"In My Veins"

The session was broadcast on February 1, 1989, on "The John Peel Show" on BBC Radio 1.

References

Prong (band) albums
Strange Fruit Records EPs
Prong
1990 EPs
Live EPs
1990 live albums